Kerala Science and Technology Museum is an autonomous institution established by Government of Kerala, India, in 1984, as a center for popularisation of science and scientific temper among the general public, especially among the young generation. The institution is in the heart of Thiruvananthapuram city, in Kerala. The Priyadarsini Planetarium is attached to the museum, functioning since 1994.

References

External links

1984 establishments in Kerala
Science museums in India
Science centres in India
Organisations based in Thiruvananthapuram
Museums in Thiruvananthapuram
Science and technology in Kerala
Museums established in 1984